Baba Hafusa is a studio album by Nigerian rap act Reminisce which was released through EDGE Records on 30 April 2015. It is the rapper's third overall studio album after releasing Book of Rap Stories in 2012 and Alaga Ibile in 2013. The studio album which features guest appearances from SoJay, Vector, Ice Prince, Olamide, Phyno, Sossick and Sean Tizzle was according to Reminisce a way of paying tribute to his daughter named Hafusa.

Critical reception
Upon its release, Baba Hafusa was received with mixed reviews and opinions. Awarding the album four stars from tooXclusive, Ogaga Sakpaide states, ““Baba Hafusa” sees Reminisce in his comfort zone from a lyrical and production view.” Tola Sarumi of notJustOk rated the album 5.5 out of 10 stating that, “even as a commercial album, Baba Hafusa doesn’t do enough to hold your attention.”

Accolades

Commercial performance
On 18 May 2015, Baba Hafusa rose to 12th position on the Billboard World Music Albums Charts after topping the iTunes album sales for over a week less than 24-hours after its release.

Track listing

Release history

References

2015 albums
Albums produced by Shizzi
Yoruba-language albums
Igbo-language albums
Albums produced by Sarz
Albums produced by Young John (producer)
Reminisce (musician) albums